The Bezold–Brücke shift or luminance-on-hue effect is a change in hue perception as light intensity changes. As intensity increases, spectral colors shift more towards blue (if below 500 nm) or yellow (if above 500 nm). At lower intensities, the red/green axis dominates. This means that reds become more yellow with increasing brightness. Light may change in the perceived hue as its brightness changes, despite the fact that it retains a constant spectral composition. It was discovered by Wilhelm von Bezold and M.E. Brücke.

The shift in the hue of the colors that occur as the intensity of the corresponding energy change is materially increased, except in some cases like the change for certain invariable hues (approximating the psychologically primary hues). Both Bezold & Brücke worked on the Bezold-Brücke effect and gave important contributions in the field of optical illusions.

This effect is a problem for simple HSV-style color models, which treat hue and intensity as independent parameters. In contrast, color appearance models try to factor in this effect.

The shift in the hue is also accompanied by the changes in the perceived saturation. As the brightness of the color stimuli increases, their color strength also increases to a maximum point and then decreases again; in such a way that it is still wavelength specific. This can, to an extent, be considered as an inverse of the Helmholtz–Kohlrausch effect. In the case of the Helmholtz–Kohlrausch effect, the partially desaturated stimulus is seen to be brighter than fully saturated or achromatic stimulus.

See also 

 Opponent process
 Purkinje shift
 Abney effect

Bibliography 

 W. von Bezold: Die Farbenlehre in Hinblick auf Kunst und Kunstgewerbe. Braunschweig 1874.
 "Über das Gesetz der Farbenmischung und die physiologischen Grundfarben", Annalen der Physiologischen Chemie, 1873, 226: 221–247.
M. E. Brücke, “Über einige Empfindungen im Gebiet der Sehnerven,” Sitz. Ber. d. K. K. Akad. d. Wissensch. Math. Nat. Wiss. 1878, 77:39–71.

References

Color appearance phenomena